Jean Theodoro Sobrinho (born 25 February 1993) is a Brazilian professional footballer who plays as a midfielder.

References

External links
Jean Theodoro at meusresultados
Jean Sobrinho at ZeroZero

1993 births
Living people
Brazilian footballers
Association football midfielders
Campeonato Brasileiro Série B players
Moldovan Super Liga players
Associação Portuguesa de Desportos players
Sport Club Corinthians Paulista players
Associação Atlética Flamengo players
Avaí FC players
Camboriú Futebol Clube players
ABC Futebol Clube players
TSV Hartberg players
FC Zimbru Chișinău players
Oeste Futebol Clube players
Batatais Futebol Clube players
Olímpia Futebol Clube players
Brazilian expatriate footballers
Brazilian expatriate sportspeople in Austria
Expatriate footballers in Austria
Brazilian expatriate sportspeople in Moldova
Expatriate footballers in Moldova